Kocherga (meaning fire iron) is a gender-neutral Slavic surname. Notable people with the surname include:

Anatoly Kocherga (born 1947), Ukrainian opera singer
Sergei Sholokhov (born Kocherga in 1980), Russian football player

Russian-language surnames